is a rural district located in Yamagata Prefecture, Japan.
As of December 2013, the district has an estimated population of 30,443 and an area of 1,224.89 km2. Most of the city of Nagai was formerly part of Nishiokitami District.

Towns and villages
Iide
Oguni
Shirataka

History
Okitami County was an ancient place name in part of Dewa Province. Under the Tokugawa shogunate, the portion which became Nishiokitami district consisted of 116 villages entirely within the area controlled by Yonezawa Domain. The area was designated Yonezawa Prefecture in August 1871, renamed Okitami Prefecture in December 1871, and became part of Yamagata Prefecture in 1876. Nishiokitami District was created on November 1, 1878. With the establishment of the municipalities system on April 1, 1889, it was organized into one town (Nagai) and 16 villages.

 On December 3, 1890 Arato was raised to town status 
 On November 3, 1942 Oguni was raised to town status
 On October 10, 1954 Shirataka was raised to town status 
 On November 15, 1954 Nagai was raised to city status
 On April 1, 1958 Iide was raised to city status

Districts in Yamagata Prefecture